Mount Pico de Loro, also known as Mount Palay-Palay, is a dormant volcano located on the border of Cavite and Batangas, in the island of Luzon, Philippines. The mountain is one of the ancient volcanic features of  Bataan Arc.

History

Pico de Loro was first named by Spanish sea-farers which means "Parrot's Beak" as its pointed summit resembles the shape of a parrot's beak from afar and it is commonly used as a signal by sea-farers to turn east to get to Manila Bay.

Governance

Under the Proclamation No. 1315 s. 2007  of the Philippine government, the Mounts Palay-Palay–Mataas-na-Gulod Protected Landscape is placed under the protection and jurisdiction of the Department of Environment and Natural Resources.

Geology 
Pico de Loro is found within the Talahib Andesite rock formation (Avila, 1980). This is seen as being comparable to the Nasugbu Volcanic Complex (MGB, 2005). The Talahib Andesite is visible in western, central, and southeastern Batangas. It is overlain by the Mapulo Limestone (Avila, 1980), which is regarded to be identical to the Calatagan Formation in the upper sections of Talahib River's western branch and also along the Laiya River. The andesite crystal structure is vesicular and amygdaloidal, with flow banding. Additionally, fine-grained, porphyritic, and medium-grained equigranular phases are included. Intercalated with the flows are thin pyroclastic strata. Propylitization of andesite is widespread, resulting in the formation of chlorite and epidote. Generally, moderate silicification and pyritization occur along shear zones. This unit appears to be equivalent to Wolfe and others' (1980) Banoy Volcanics, which they date to the Middle to Late Miocene.

Hiking activity

Near its summit is a lone vertical cliff feature called the Parrot's Beak or the Monolith that offers a 360-degree view of the protected landscape and the shores of Limbones Cove. Hiking has been closed for rehabilitation purposes since October 1, 2016. Hiking was still prohibited during the COVID-19 pandemic in 2020, which was extended until the middle of 2022 due to trail damage caused by Typhoon Jolina in 2021, and it was under renovation. On December 21, 2022, the Protected Area Management Board of Mounts Palay-Palay–Mataas-na-Gulod Protected Landscape declared a soft opening of hiking activities via online booking with limited participants. The full-open hiking activity is scheduled for January 12, 2023.

See also
 List of mountains in the Philippines
 List of national parks of the Philippines

References

Mountains of the Philippines
Landforms of Cavite
Landforms of Batangas